San Bernardino International Airport (initialism: SBIA) is a public airport two miles (3 km) southeast of downtown San Bernardino, California, in San Bernardino County, California, United States.

The facility is a commercial, general aviation, and cargo airport on the site of the former San Bernardino Municipal Airport, which was converted during World War II into the San Bernardino Air Depot in 1942 and which was subsequently renamed, "Norton Air Force Base," before being decommissioned with the fall of the Soviet Union.

San Bernardino International Airport encompasses three passenger terminals, including the following: a domestic terminal where Breeze Airways operates daily non-stop service to and from San Francisco International and daily one-stop, direct flights to and from Provo, Utah; an international terminal with U.S. Customs and Border Protection; and, the Luxivair executive terminal, which is an airport-owned fixed-base operator.

History
The Norton Air Force Base opened shortly after the attacks on Pearl Harbor. Norton was placed on the Department of Defense's base closure list in 1989.

Most parts of San Bernardino International Airport were completed in 2011, though a customs facility was still under construction. San Bernardino International Airport was built to conform to aviation-demand modeling and allocations performed as part of the 2008 Regional Transportation Plan (R.T.P.) of the Southern California Association of Governments (SCAG), the Metropolitan Planning Organization for San Bernardino, Los Angeles, Riverside, Ventura, Imperial, and Orange counties.

The 2008 R.T.P. projected 9.4 million passengers and 1.29 million tons of air cargo at San Bernardino International Airport in 2035 with improved ground access provided, in part, by high-speed rail. The California High-Speed Rail Authority is currently performing alternatives analysis regarding the Los Angeles-to-San Diego segment, which includes, along the I-215 alignment, an optional station location at Rialto Avenue and E Street in the city of San Bernardino. The 2008 R.T.P states, "The high speed, reliability, and predictability of high-speed airport access will be needed to overcome mounting and increasingly unpredictable traffic congestion (on area freeways)."

U.S. Customs and Border Protection agents are available on call to clear imported goods. The airport is used as a base for United States Forest Service planes fighting forest fires. Several hangars that were formerly empty have recently been occupied by civilian-owned aircraft maintenance companies.

San Bernardino County grand jury and FBI investigations
An audit completed June 2011 at the request of a grand jury investigation found examples of potential mismanagement and financial irregularities. In September 2011, as part of a special joint corruption task force, the FBI raided the offices of the airport and the home of airport developer Scot Spencer to secure internal documents. In late September 2011, Don Rogers, the Director of the SBIA Authority (SBIAA) resigned.

Airlines and destinations

Passenger

Cargo

Passenger terminal
San Bernardino has two terminals, one for domestic travel and the other for international airline service. Volaris, a Mexican low-cost airline, announced the beginning of flights to Guadalajara, Mexico in November 2017; however, these plans were later cancelled. In March 2022, Breeze Airways first announced plans to operate passenger service at the airport. Finally, on August 4, 2022, Breeze Airways became the first commercial airline to operate passenger flights in and out of SBD's never-been-used domestic air terminal, with daily flights to San Francisco.

Location

The airport and some of the surrounding area is within the city of San Bernardino and the Inland Valley Development Agency. The surrounding areas are being redeveloped by Hillwood.

The airport is about two miles east of downtown San Bernardino and 14 miles northeast of downtown Riverside. It is six miles northwest of downtown Redlands, on the outskirts of Highland. Motorists can use the San Bernardino Freeway (Interstate 10), Barstow Freeway (Interstate 215), or the Foothill Freeway.

Ground transportation
The Omnitrans route 15 bus connects from North Del Rosa Dr. and East Rialto St. to the Downtown San Bernardino station, where Metrolink connections are available to Union Station Los Angeles.

In popular culture
The airport was the filming location for the 1996 movie Executive Decision, the 2001 movie The Fast and the Furious and the 2004 Martin Scorsese film The Aviator using a Lockheed Constellation preserved by the National Airline History Museum, and flown in for the shoot, with one hangar "dressed" as a Trans World Airlines facility.

References

External links

 
 
 

Airports in San Bernardino County, California